Gymnastics at the 2005 Southeast Asian Games was divided into three sub-categories: artistic gymnastics, rhythmic gymnastics, and aerobics. The artistic gymnastics was held from November 29 to December 1, the rhythmic gymnastics from December 2 to December 3, and the aerobics from December 4 to December 5. All events were held at the Rizal Memorial Stadium at the Rizal Memorial Sports Complex, in Malate, Manila, Philippines.

Medal table

Medalists

Artistic

Men

Women

Rhythmic

Women

Aerobic

External links
Southeast Asian Games Official Results

2005 Southeast Asian Games events
Gymnastics at the Southeast Asian Games
2005 in gymnastics
International gymnastics competitions hosted by the Philippines